Rogi Dam  is a gravity dam located in Kumamoto Prefecture in Japan. The dam is used for flood control and water supply. The catchment area of the dam is 6.8 km2. The dam impounds about 14  ha of land when full and can store 2290 thousand cubic meters of water. The construction of the dam was started on 1992 and completed in 2013.

See also
List of dams in Japan

References

Dams in Kumamoto Prefecture